Ilnacora is a genus of plant bugs in the family Miridae. There are more than 20 described species in Ilnacora.

Species
These 25 species belong to the genus Ilnacora:

 Ilnacora albifrons Knight, 1963
 Ilnacora arizonae Knight, 1963
 Ilnacora arnaudi Carvalho, 1986
 Ilnacora chihuahuaensis Knight & Schaffner, 1976
 Ilnacora chloris (Uhler, 1877)
 Ilnacora divisa Reuter, 1876
 Ilnacora furcata Knight, 1963
 Ilnacora illini Knight, 1941
 Ilnacora infusca Knight & Schaffner, 1976
 Ilnacora inusta (Distant, 1884)
 Ilnacora malina (Uhler, 1877)
 Ilnacora mexicana Knight & Schaffner, 1976
 Ilnacora nicholi Knight, 1963
 Ilnacora nigrinasi (Van Duzee, 1916)
 Ilnacora pallida Knight & Schaffner, 1976
 Ilnacora recurvata Knight, 1963
 Ilnacora sanctacatalinae Knight
 Ilnacora santacatalinae Knight, 1963
 Ilnacora schaffneri Knight, 1963
 Ilnacora sonorensis Carvalho & Costa, 1992
 Ilnacora spicata Knight, 1963
 Ilnacora stalii Reuter, 1876
 Ilnacora tepicensis Carvalho & Costa, 1992
 Ilnacora texana Knight & Schaffner, 1976
 Ilnacora vittifrons Knight, 1963

References

Further reading

External links

 

Miridae genera
Articles created by Qbugbot
Orthotylini